The 1949 NCAA Swimming and Diving Championships  were contested in March 1949 at the Bowman Gray Pool at the University of North Carolina in Chapel Hill, North Carolina at the 13th annual NCAA-sanctioned swim meet to determine the team and individual national champions of men's collegiate swimming and diving in the United States. 

After finishing second in 1948, Ohio State once again topped the team standings, claiming their fourth title in five years and their fifth title overall.

Program changes
One event, 150-yard individual medley, was re-added to the NCAA championships program this year; it was contested once before, in 1930.

Team standings
Note: Top 10 only
(H) = Hosts
Full results

See also
List of college swimming and diving teams

References

NCAA Division I Men's Swimming and Diving Championships
NCAA Swimming And Diving Championships
NCAA Swimming And Diving Championships